The Archaeological Society of British Columbia (ASBC) is a Canadian organization founded in 1966. Since 1968 the quarterly The Midden is published with the help of  the B.C. Heritage Trust. Its headquarters is in Vancouver, bureaus can be found in Victoria, the province's capital, and since 1994 in Nanaimo also. The society has more than 300 members in Vancouver alone. Its aims are research and teaching in the field of British Columbian archaeology and the protection of artefacts. 
President in Victoria is Pete Dady, in Nanaimo Julie Cowie. The branch in Nanaimo publishes The Digger

References

External links 
 Site of the ASBC 

Organizations based in Vancouver